Littabella is a national park in Central Queensland, Australia, 336 km north of Brisbane.

The park protects a mostly palustrine wetland within the catchments of Baffle Creek and Kolan River.  Three rare or threatened animal species and one plant species have been found within the park.

See also

 Protected areas of Queensland

References

National parks of Central Queensland
Protected areas established in 1980